The Melrose Georgetown Hotel is a AAA 4-star luxury hotel located on Pennsylvania Avenue in Washington, D.C., United States. It was inducted into Historic Hotels of America, an official program of the National Trust for Historic Preservation, in 2021.

Location
The Melrose Hotel is located 5 minutes from Foggy Bottom metro stop and 10 to 15 minutes from the center of Georgetown. It is located near the White House, the Potomac Riverfront, Georgetown, the National Mall, John F. Kennedy Center for the Performing Arts and George Washington University.

Description

Public areas
The hotel's lobby features marble floors and fluted columns.

The hotel includes one restaurant, Jardenea, which features American-style food throughout the day. The hotel also offers seasonal al fresco dining facilities. The Library Bar features dark-panelled wood, and has outdoor patio space. Both the bar and restaurant are located near the lobby.

There is also a small gym with a full set of weights and six pieces of cardiovascular equipment but with no natural light.

Guest rooms
The hotel contains eight floors and 240 French-inspired rooms for guests, which were last renovated in 2001.

References

External links
Official Site Melrose Hotel DC

Hotels in Washington, D.C.
Historic Hotels of America